Patricia D'Arbanville is an American actress known for her appearance in Andy Warhol projects.

Career
After Flesh, D'Arbanville performed in Warhol's L'Amour (1973), and as the title character in the David Hamilton film Bilitis (1977).

After her unabashedly risqué performances in her youth, D'Arbanville has worked steadily in film and television series in the United States and France. In 1987, D'Arbanville won a Drama-Logue Award as Best Actress for her stage performance in Italian American Reconciliation (1987). She was well known for her role as Lt. Virginia Cooper on the FOX series New York Undercover.

Personal life
In the late 1960s, when she was a model in London, D'Arbanville met and developed a romance with singer and songwriter Cat Stevens. She was the inspiration for his hit song "Lady D'Arbanville".

D'Arbanville left Stevens for periods of time to continue her modeling career in Paris and New York City, and was a part of Warhol's Factory scene. In an interview with Warhol, she said wistfully that she had heard the song "Lady D'Arbanville": 

Stevens wrote that song "Lady D'Arbanville" when I left for New York. I left for a month, it wasn't the end of the world was it? But he wrote this whole song about "Lady D'Arbanville, why do you sleep so still." It's about me dead. So while I was in New York, for him it was like I was lying in a coffin... He wrote that because he missed me, because he was down... It's a sad song.

D'Arbanville later had a relationship with actor Don Johnson from 1981 to 1986. The couple had a son, Jesse Wayne Johnson (born December 7, 1982).

D'Arbanville has been married and divorced three times. She lived in France for ten years, becoming fluent in French, and was married to French actor , then known as Roger Mirmont, from August 1, 1975, to 1980. From April 26, 1980, to 1981, her husband was Steve Curry. She was then married to former New York City firefighter Terry Quinn from June 15, 1993, to March 12, 2002. They have three children: daughters Emmelyn and Alexandra; and son Liam.

Filmography

Film

Television

References

External links

 
 Patti D'Arbanville interviewed by Bob Colacello Andy Warhol's Interview – April 1973.

Actresses from New York City
American expatriates in France
American expatriates in England
American film actresses
American soap opera actresses
American television actresses
Living people
20th-century American actresses
21st-century American actresses
Muses
Griffith family
Year of birth missing (living people)